Jean-Pierre Hoscheid (22 June 1912 – 15 July 1988) was a Luxembourgian footballer. He competed in the men's tournament at the 1936 Summer Olympics.  With Jules Müller and Albert Reuter he co-managed the Luxembourg national football team from 1948 until 1949. They managed Luxembourg in the football tournament of the 1948 Summer Olympic Games where Luxembourg were eliminated in the first round 6–1 by Yugoslavia.

References

External links
 

1912 births
1988 deaths
Luxembourgian footballers
Luxembourg international footballers
Olympic footballers of Luxembourg
Footballers at the 1936 Summer Olympics
People from Mersch (canton)
Association football goalkeepers
Luxembourgian football managers
Luxembourg national football team managers